Lenslok is a copy protection mechanism found in some computer games and other software on the 8-bit Atari computers, Commodore 64, ZX Spectrum, Sinclair QL, MSX and Amstrad CPC. The first game to use it was Elite for the ZX Spectrum.

Overview 

Lenslok was released in 1985 as a plastic lens in a foldaway frame. The Lenslok device was essentially a row of prisms arranged vertically in a plastic holder. Before the game started, a two-letter code was displayed on the screen, but it was corrupted by being split into vertical bands which were then rearranged on screen. By viewing these bands through the Lenslok they were restored to their correct order and the code could be read and entered allowing access to the game. The device was small enough when folded flat to fit next to an audio cassette in a standard case.

In order for the Lenslok to work correctly the displayed image has to be the correct size. This meant that before each use the software needed to be calibrated to take account of the size of the display. Users found this setup particularly annoying, at least in part because they found the instructions that were initially shipped unclear. Additionally, the device could not be calibrated at all for very large and very small televisions, and some games shipped with mismatched Lensloks that prevented the code from being correctly descrambled. The Lenslok system was not used in later releases of Elite.

Software 

Lenslok was used only on 11 releases: 

 ACE, released by Cascade Games
 Elite, released by Firebird
 The Advanced Music System, released by Firebird
 Fighter Pilot, released by Digital Integration
 Graphic Adventure Creator, released by Incentive Software
 Jewels of Darkness, released by Rainbird
 OCP Art Studio, released by Rainbird
 The Price of Magik, released by Level 9 Computing
 Supercharge, released by Digital Precision
 Tomahawk, released by Digital Integration
 TT Racer, released by Digital Integration

See also
 Product key

References

External links 
 Lenslok Instruction Sheet (PDF file)
 Bird Sanctuary - Lenslok Article containing further details on Lenslok, with photographs.
 LensKey A Lenslok emulator allowing access to emulated versions of the games.

Copy protection
ZX Spectrum
Atari 8-bit family